Mirganj may refer to:

 Mirganj, Bihar
 Mirganj, Uttar Pradesh